Chicago XXXIV: Live in '75 is a live album by the American band Chicago, their thirty-fourth album overall, recorded in 1975 and released in 2011. After releasing its eighth consecutive gold album in six years, Chicago embarked upon a stadium tour in 1975. The album includes selections from all of the group's albums through its then-current Chicago VIII.

Track listing

Personnel
Chicago (1975)
Robert Lamm – vocals, keyboards
Terry Kath – vocals, guitar
Peter Cetera – vocals, bass
Danny Seraphine – drums
Laudir de Oliveira – congas, percussion
Lee Loughnane – trumpet, vocals
James Pankow – trombone
Walter Parazaider – woodwinds

Technical personnel
Andrew Sandoval – mixing
Paul Smith – mixing assistant
Charles Benson – mastering

References

External links

2011 live albums
Chicago (band) live albums
Rhino Handmade live albums